Meredith Lake (born 1980) is an Australian author, historian of religion and broadcaster.

Early life and education
Lake grew up in Sydney in a devout Anglican household. She has a PhD from the University of Sydney, exploring religious narratives about land in colonial Australia, with a 2008 thesis titled "'Such Spiritual Acres': Protestantism, the land and the colonisation of Australia 1788–1850."

Career
Lake is an Honorary Associate of the Department of History at Sydney University. Her 2012 essay on Christianity and colonialism won the Bruce Mansfield Prize for best article in the Journal of Religious History.  Her 2013 book Faith in Action: HammondCare is a history of one of Australia's "largest but least known" Christian charities, founded by Rev Robert Hammond whose relief centre in Sydney helped people including "Mr Eternity" Arthur Stace and politician John Hatton.

Lake's 2018 book The Bible in Australia: A Cultural History, which looks at the impact of the Bible on Australia, won the Australian History prize at the 2019 Prime Minister's Literary Awards and the NSW Premier's History Awards, the Non-Fiction award at the 2020 Adelaide Festival Awards for Literature, and was the 2018 Australian Christian Book of the Year and the 2019 Council for the Humanities Arts and Social Sciences book of the year. The judges of the Prime Minister's award said the book "presents, for the first time, a thorough examination of the broad cultural, political, and historical context that Christianity and the Bible have played in Australia since 1788" and called Lake's writing "lively, energetic and highly accessible."

Since January 2019, Lake has presented the ABC Radio National program "Soul Search" about faith and spirituality. She has also appeared on ABC TV and community radio stations as well as guest-hosting the TV program Compass. In April 2021, she gave the annual May McLeod lecture at the United Theological College in Sydney.

Personal life
Lake is a Christian and is married with children. Her youngest child was born in 2018, around the same time she completed her book manuscript.

Publications

Books

Articles and chapters

References

External links
 Official website

Living people
1980 births
Writers from Sydney
University of Sydney alumni
Academic staff of the University of Sydney
Australian Anglicans
Australian historians of religion
Australian women historians
ABC radio (Australia) journalists and presenters